Ellen M. Lewis (professionally known as E. M. Lewis) is an American playwright, teacher, and opera librettist based in Oregon.

Career
Lewis pursued as degrees in literature (BA English, MFA Writing) before moving to Baltimore in 2013 to train with the American Lyric Theater’s Composer Librettist Development Program.

Her work has gone on to receive critical success. Edward Albee, in his award citation for Heads, remarked it was ″provocative and wonderfully threatening.″ The LA Weekly observed the play that “the question of who we are beneath our posturing lands with such force, it jangles the nerves long after the play has ended.” Of Magellanica The New Yorker wrote ″part drawing-room comedy, part locked-room mystery, Magellanica de-abstracts the larger threats surrounding the characters and their relationships, gradually immersing the audience in possibilities usually too complex—or too disturbing—to face.″ Her one-man The Gun Show, which went on tour across the U.S. and to the Edinburgh Fringe Festival, has been called a “compact yet high-caliber theatrical, a short one-hour blast of personal recollection, rhetoric and genuinely conflicted questioning.”

Her plays have been workshop, developed, and produced by a range of organizations, including the Edinburgh Fringe Festival, American Lyric Theatre, The Lark, Page 73, Project Y, Ashland New Plays Festival, Arkansas New Play Festival, PlayFest Santa Barbara, EcoDrama Festival, the HotCity Greenhouse Festival, Great Plains Theater Conference, Last Frontier Theater Conference, William Inge Center for the Arts, Artists Repertory Theater, TimeLine Theater, Guthrie Theatre, Playwrights Theater of New Jersey,  New Voices for the Theater Program, Theatre Latte Da, Moving Arts, Passage Theater, 16th Street Theater, and University of Maryland Opera Studio, among others.

Originally from rural Oregon, Lewis has taught at Southern Illinois University Edwardsville, Lewis & Clark College, Independence Community College, and Hostos Community College. She returned to the Pacific northwest in 2014, where she writes and frequently gives workshops through the ArtsHub at Artists Repertory Theatre. She is a member of the writing collective LineStorm Playwrights, International Center for Women Playwrights, the National Opera Center, and the Dramatists Guild.

Awards
In addition to this positive critical reception, Lewis has been a finalist for the Sundance Theater Lab, Oregon Book Award, the Shakespeare's Sisters fellowship, Arizona Opera’s “Arizona Bold!” program, and a semi-finalist for the O’Neill Playwrights Conference.
 2018 Edgerton Award, Theater Communications Group
 2016 Drama Fellowship, Oregon Book Awards
 2012 Drama Fellowship, New Jersey State Arts Commission
 2010 Hodder Fellowship, Princeton University
 2009 Harold and Mimi Steinberg New Play Award, American Theater Critics Association 
 2009 EcoDrama Playwrighting Competition, University of Oregon
 2008 Francesca Primus Prize, American Theater Critics Association
 2008 Ted Schmitt Award, Los Angeles Drama Critics Circle
 2008 Ashland New Plays Festival
 2007 Production of the Year, L.A. Weekly
 2007 New Works for the Stage Competition, Coe College
 2007 IN10 Competition, University of Maryland / Baltimore County

Works

Full-Length Plays
 Apple Season
 Goodbye, Ruby Tuesday
 The Great Divide, co-commission for Artists Repertory Theatre and the Oregon Shakespeare Festival “American Revolutions” cycle
 The Gun Show
 Heads
 How the Light Gets In
 Infinite Black Suitcase
 Magellanica
 Now Comes the Night
 Reading to Vegetables
 Song of Extinction
 The Stone Languages
 True Story
 You Can See All the Stars

One-Acts
 Dorothy's Dictionary
 The Edge of Ross Island

Operas
 Town Hall with Theo Popov
 Dear Erich with Ted Rosenthal
 The Crossing with Clarice Assad
 Sherlock Holmes and the Case of the Fallen Giant with Evan Meier

Published works

References

External links
 Samuel French profile

Willamette University alumni
University of Southern California alumni
Princeton University alumni
Writers from Oregon
Living people
Year of birth missing (living people)
People from Silverton, Oregon
Hostos Community College faculty